The Dolphin is a Grade II listed public house and nightclub at 165 Mare Street, Hackney Central in the London Borough of Hackney, London.

It is on the Campaign for Real Ale's National Inventory of Historic Pub Interiors.

It was built about 1850.

In mid 2013 the pub was at risk of closure after Hackney police claimed 92 reports of thefts between June 2012 and June 2013. An online petition was created to save the venue, which as of 16 September 2013 had received 2678 signatures and a social media campaign on Twitter using the hashtag #SaveTheDolphin attracted support from presenter Caroline Flack and even telecoms company O2. Actor Michael Fassbender also gave his support to the petition sharing that John Maclean's short film Pitch Black Heist, in which he starred, had scenes filmed at the pub.

In September 2013, Hackney Council stripped the pub of its 4 am late licence after local police applied for a review citing 160 crimes were reported at the venue between 2010 and 2013, including a firearm incident and rising thefts. However a year later in September 2014, the pub regained its 4 am weekend licence following a decision at Stratford magistrates court, with Hackney Council's chair of licensing councillor Emma Plouviez saying: "Managers at The Dolphin have made efforts to tackle the disproportionately high levels of theft at the pub."

In 2021, the venue's licence was suspended after the police raised concerns about their response to a serious assault on Friday, October 15th where a man was hit with a glass and subsequently required hospital treatment.

See also
 List of pubs in London

References

Pubs in the London Borough of Hackney
Grade II listed pubs in London
National Inventory Pubs
19th-century architecture in the United Kingdom
Buildings and structures completed in the 19th century
Hackney, London
Hackney Central